Joseph Tsatsu Agbenu (born November 20, 1936) is a Ghanaian politician and a member of the Fourth Parliament of the Fourth Republic representing the Afram Plains North Constituency in the Eastern Region of Ghana.

Early life and education 
Agbenu was born on November 20, 1936, in the Eastern Region, in a town called Afram Plains.

Career 
Agbenu is a lawyer and a former member of Parliament to the Afram Plain North Constituency from 2005 to 2009 in the Eastern Region of Ghana.

Politics 
Agbenu was first elected into Parliament on the ticket of the National Democratic Congress during the December 2000 Ghanaian General Elections as a member of Parliament for the Afram Plain North Constituency. He was chosen over Joseph Buer Plahar.of the New Patriotic Party (NPP), Albert Quarcoo-Zah of the Convention People's Party (CPP), Amidu Tanko of the People's National Convention (PNC) and Azilaku Emmanuel Yaw of the National Reform Party (NRP). He won a total votes of 17,073 which was equivalent to 80.30%. His opponents had 2,240, 1,134, 475and 349 respectively. These votes represent 10.50%, 5.30%, 2.20% and 1.60% of the total votes cast. He was then reelected in 2005 after emerging winner of the 2004 Ghanaian General Elections. He polled 18,905 votes out of the 24,556 valid votes cast representing 77.00%. He served only one term as a Parliamentarian.

Personal life 
Agbenu is a Christian.

References 

Living people
1936 births
National Democratic Congress (Ghana) politicians
20th-century Ghanaian lawyers
People from Eastern Region (Ghana)
Ghanaian MPs 2005–2009
Ghanaian Christians
Government ministers of Ghana
21st-century Ghanaian politicians
Ghanaian educators
Ghanaian MPs 2001–2005